Flávio da Conceição (born 12 June 1974) is a Brazilian former professional footballer who played as a midfielder.

Conceição enjoyed a successful career in Spain, where he played for two clubs—including Real Madrid with whom he won six major titles—and also represented Brazil on more than 40 occasions.

Club career
Born in Santa Maria da Serra, São Paulo, Conceição began his career with Rio Branco in 1992. He then joined Palmeiras a year later, and racked up over 100 first-team appearances during his spell. This caught the attention of Spanish club Deportivo de La Coruña, who paid €5.2 million for him after the 1996 Summer Olympics.

Playing alongside compatriot Mauro Silva in central midfield, Conceição gradually developed into a key force in the Galicians' rise in Spanish football, as he scored four goals in 27 games in the team's 1999–2000 league conquest. This led to a 2000 move to fellow La Liga side Real Madrid, worth €26 million.

Although he appeared sparingly, Conceição did win two league titles and the 2001–02 edition of the UEFA Champions League – in that competition, he set up Steve McManaman for the closing 2–0 semi-final win against FC Barcelona at the Camp Nou. He spent the 2003–04 campaign on loan to Borussia Dortmund, where he was also irregularly played.

In the summer of 2004, Conceição moved to Turkey's Galatasaray. In his first and only season he won the Turkish Cup but failed to make the Champions League, thus activating a clause in his contract which allowed him to leave, and he signed for Panathinaikos of Greece.

Afflicted with injuries and loss of form, Conceição was released and retired at the age of 32.

International career
Conceição earned 45 caps for Brazil and scored four goals, and was part of the nation's 1997 and 1999 Copa América-winning sides. He was also picked for two FIFA Confederations Cup tournaments, making four appearances in the 1997 edition for the eventual champions.

In addition, Conceição won a bronze medal at the 1996 Olympics in Atlanta, but was never summoned for any FIFA World Cup.

Honours
Palmeiras
Campeonato Brasileiro Série A: 1993, 1994

Deportivo de La Coruña
La Liga: 1999–2000

Real Madrid
La Liga: 2000–01, 2002–03
Supercopa de España: 2001
UEFA Champions League: 2001–02
UEFA Super Cup: 2002
Intercontinental Cup: 2002

Galatasaray
Turkish Cup: 2004–05

Brazil U23
Summer Olympic bronze medalist: 1996

Brazil
FIFA Confederations Cup: 1997
Copa América: 1997, 1999
CONCACAF Gold Cup runner-up: 1996

References

External links

Deportivo archives

1974 births
Living people
Footballers from São Paulo (state)
Brazilian footballers
Association football midfielders
Campeonato Brasileiro Série A players
Campeonato Brasileiro Série C players
Campeonato Brasileiro Série D players
Rio Branco Esporte Clube players
Sociedade Esportiva Palmeiras players
La Liga players
Deportivo de La Coruña players
Real Madrid CF players
Bundesliga players
Borussia Dortmund players
Süper Lig players
Galatasaray S.K. footballers
Super League Greece players
Panathinaikos F.C. players
Brazil international footballers
1997 FIFA Confederations Cup players
1999 FIFA Confederations Cup players
FIFA Confederations Cup-winning players
1996 CONCACAF Gold Cup players
1997 Copa América players
1998 CONCACAF Gold Cup players
1999 Copa América players
Copa América-winning players
Footballers at the 1996 Summer Olympics
Olympic footballers of Brazil
Olympic medalists in football
Medalists at the 1996 Summer Olympics
Olympic bronze medalists for Brazil
UEFA Champions League winning players
Brazilian expatriate footballers
Brazilian expatriate sportspeople in Spain
Expatriate footballers in Spain
Brazilian expatriate sportspeople in Germany
Expatriate footballers in Germany
Brazilian expatriate sportspeople in Turkey
Expatriate footballers in Turkey
Brazilian expatriate sportspeople in Greece
Expatriate footballers in Greece